Days of Wonder is a board game publisher founded in 2002 and owned by Asmodee Group since 2014. Days of Wonder distributes its games to 25 countries. It specializes in German-style board games and has branched out to include some online games. Days of Wonder has published games in several languages including English, Dutch, French, German, Russian, and Greek. Days of Wonder was co-founded by Eric Hautemont, Mark Kaufmann and Yann Corno.

History 
Days of Wonder was founded in 2002 by Mark Kaufmann, Eric Hautemont and Yann Corno. It released its first game, Gang of Four in 2002. In March 2004, the company released Ticket to Ride, designed by Alan R. Moon. In 2004, Ticket to Ride was awarded the Spiel des Jahres. In 2006, the company released a digital version of Ticket to Ride. Also in 2006, the company's game Shadows Over Camelot was named the Best Fantasy Game at the 2006 Spiel des Jahres.

In 2009, Smallworld received three awards including "Best Game of the Year", "Best Family Game", and "Best Game Artwork" from the Dice Tower Gaming Awards.

In 2014, Days of Wonder was acquired by French game distributor Asmodee Group.

Games Published
Below are all of the games published by Days of Wonder from 2002 to 2018:

Small Box games

Awards and honors

See also
 Going Cardboard (Documentary)

References

External links
 Company website
 Company page at Boardgamegeek.com

Board game publishing companies